Heliodoro Carlos Díaz Escarraga (born 17 December 1951) is a Mexican politician from the Institutional Revolutionary Party. He has served as Deputy of the LIX and LXI Legislatures of the Mexican Congress representing Oaxaca.

He was the President of the Chamber of Deputies in 2005–2006.

References

1951 births
Living people
People from Oaxaca City
Presidents of the Chamber of Deputies (Mexico)
Members of the Chamber of Deputies (Mexico)
Institutional Revolutionary Party politicians
21st-century Mexican politicians